In motorsports, a factory-backed racing team or driver is one sponsored by a vehicle manufacturer in official competitions. As motorsport competition is an expensive endeavor, some degree of factory support is desired and often necessary for success. The lowest form of factory backing comes in the form of contingency awards, based upon performance, which help to defray the cost of competing. Full factory backing can be often seen in the highest forms of international competition, with major motorsport operations often receiving hundreds of millions of euros to represent a particular manufacturer.

One-make series can also be backed by the factory, notably Ferrari Challenge and Porsche Supercup purely to allow themselves sell their competition specials of their models to customers and to organize series. These series commonly offer prize money and even sometimes a factory drive in an upper-level series.

In lower level racing, support from dealerships and importers may also be referred to as factory backing. In drifting, where factory backed teams are few and far between (Mopar and Pontiac of Formula D for example), works team/drivers are those backed by large or highly established tuning companies, as opposed to those entered by the drivers themselves or smaller and less well-off tuning companies. The advantage to this is drivers can get access to expensive prototype parts provided by the company that are not yet available to customers and in the event of their car being too badly damaged to compete, a back-up car will be available to them.

See also
 Satellite team
 Works team
 Privateer (motorsport)

References

External links

Motorsport terminology